The Cervantes Group is an international information technology consulting and talent acquisition firm with offices in San Juan, Querétaro, Mexico, Madrid, Spain, Boston and Chicago. Specializations include software development, project management, business analysis, mobile application development and program management.

History

The Cervantes Group is an international information technology consulting and talent acquisition corporation that does business across the U.S, Puerto Rico, and Europe. It was founded in 2004 by Joanna Bauzá González, professional tennis player and entrepreneur from Guaynabo, Puerto Rico, and Timothy B. Mullen of Evanston, Illinois, originally operating from their house in San Juan, Puerto Rico.

In 2011, Joanna Bauzá and Timothy B. Mullen received the "Zenit Teodoro Moscoso Award", which is the young entrepreneur of the year award given by governor of Puerto Rico, honorable Luis Guillermo Fortuño Burset. That same year, The Cervantes Group was placed at number 1465 on Inc.'s magazine 5000 list of the fastest-growing private companies in America based on an annual growth over 191%. Again, The Cervantes Group made the prestigious list of Inc. Magazine's top 5000 fastest growing private companies in the U.S. at #3,945.

On April 24, 2015, the President of Marquette University, Dr. Michael Lovell, conferred the Spirit of Marquette Award to the founders of The Cervantes Group, Mullen and Bauzá. An "All-University" Award it was given by Marquette University and is one of only six recipients for the entire 2015 calendar year. On April 30, 2015, The Cervantes Group received the award for "Excellence in Quality of Service in 2015" by the Puerto Rico Product Association, during their annual award ceremony "Made in Puerto Rico Day". In September 2016, Joanna Bauzá was named part of the board of trustees for Marquette University .

Affiliates
The Cervantes Group LLC – U.S.
The Cervantes Group Inc. – Puerto Rico
The Cervantes Group S.L. – Europe

References

External links
 
 Article: Keeping Bar High

Companies based in San Juan, Puerto Rico
Information technology consulting firms of the United States